Wierzbnik  (German Herzogswalde) is a village in the administrative district of Gmina Grodków, within Brzeg County, Opole Voivodeship, in south-western Poland.

External links 
 Jewish Community in Wierzbnik on Virtual Shtetl

References

Wierzbnik